Heimdal Church is a parish church of the Church of Norway in Trondheim municipality in Trøndelag county, Norway. It is the church for the Heimdal parish which is part of the Heimdal og Byåsen prosti (deanery) in the Diocese of Nidaros. The modern, white, concrete church was built in a rectangular design in 1960 using plans drawn up by the architect Herman Semmelmann. The church seats about 180 people.

History
In 1932, the Heimdal area parishioners formed the Heimdal Chapel Association which had a goal of some day building a chapel in Heimdal. In 1960, their dream was realized when a new chapel was constructed in Heimdal. The building was consecrated on 6 November 1960 by Bishop Arne Fjellbu. In 1971, the chapel was upgraded to be a full parish church.

See also
List of churches in Nidaros

References

Churches in Trondheim
Churches in Trøndelag
Rectangular churches in Norway
Concrete churches in Norway
20th-century Church of Norway church buildings
Churches completed in 1960
1960 establishments in Norway